David Graham (born 2 June 1983) is a Scottish footballer who plays as a winger for Rathfriland Rangers in Division 1B of the Northern Amateur Football League.

Career

During his youth career, Graham's former teams include Denny BC, Riverside and Gairdoch United. Graham spent his early career entirely in Scotland, mostly in leagues below the SPL. He started his career as a striker for Stenhousemuir in 2001, for whom he scored 5 goals in 53 league appearances. He moved to Stanraer where he was much more prolific, scoring 33 goals in 52 appearances – a strike rate better than a goal every other game. From there he went to ambitious Gretna but he did not do as well as he scored just 6 goals in his 68 matches. He then moved to Hamilton Academical on loan before making this move permanent in 2007.

After a successful season with the Accies, which saw him help the club win promotion to the Scottish Premier League, Graham was awarded a new two-year contract. In the January transfer window of 2009, Graham moved to Dunfermline Athletic. Graham signed for Greenock Morton in June 2012, and was released in April 2013.

In July 2013, Graham played and scored in a pre-season victory for Crusaders over Lisburn Rangers. In June 2016 Graham signed for Division 1B of the Northern Amateur Football League side Rathfriland Rangers in Northern Ireland.

Honours
Stranraer
 Scottish Football League Second Division: 2003–04
 Scottish Football League Second Division: runners-up 2004–05
Gretna
 Scottish Football League Second Division: 2005–06
 Scottish Cup: runners-up 2005–06
 Scottish Football League First Division: 2006–07
Hamilton Academical
 Scottish Football League First Division: 2007–08
Dunfermline Athletic
 Scottish Football League First Division: 2010–11
Greenock Morton
 Scottish Football League First Division: runners-up 2012–13

References

External links

1983 births
Living people
Footballers from Stirling
Scottish footballers
Association football forwards
Stenhousemuir F.C. players
Stranraer F.C. players
Gretna F.C. players
Hamilton Academical F.C. players
Dunfermline Athletic F.C. players
Scottish Football League players
Scottish Premier League players
Greenock Morton F.C. players